Maximiliano Filizzola (born 2 April 1996) is an Argentine rugby union player, currently playing for Italian Top10 side Piacenza Lyons. His preferred position is centre.

Professional career
Filizzola signed for Súper Liga Americana de Rugby side Selknam ahead of the 2021 Súper Liga Americana de Rugby season. In 2021−2022 season he played for Italian Top10 side Piacenza Lyons.
He had previously represented Argentina Sevens at 7 tournaments.

References

External links
itsrugby.co.uk Profile

1996 births
Living people
Argentine rugby union players
Rugby union centres
Selknam (rugby union) players
Rugby Lyons Piacenza players
Rugby union wings